Zerconopsis is a genus of mites in the family Ascidae, characterised by the presence of paddle-shaped setae on the back.

Species
 Zerconopsis heilongjiangensis Ma & Yin, 1998      
 Zerconopsis muestairi (Schweizer, 1949)      
 Zerconopsis pristis Halliday, Walter & Lindquist, 1998        
 Zerconopsis remiger (Kramer, 1876)      
 Zerconopsis slovacus Masan, 1998      
 Zerconopsis yichunensis Ma & Yin, 1998

References

Ascidae